The 1995 Los Angeles Dodgers season was the 106th for the franchise in Major League Baseball, and their 38th season in Los Angeles, California.

The season was notable for the American baseball debut of Japanese pitcher Hideo Nomo. In his first season with the Dodgers after an accomplished career in the Japanese leagues, Nomo went 13–6 with a 2.54 ERA and a league leading 236 strikeouts. He was the starting pitcher in the All-Star game and won the Rookie of the Year award.

The Dodgers won the National League's Western Division title, but lost to the Cincinnati Reds in the NLDS.

Regular season

Season standings

Record vs. opponents

Opening Day lineup

Notable transactions
April 26, 1995: Casey Candaele was released by the Dodgers.
May 23, 1995: Acquired Joey Eischen and Roberto Kelly from the Montreal Expos for Henry Rodríguez and Jeff Treadway.
June 9, 1995: Acquired Kris Foster from the Montreal Expos for Rafael Bournigal.
June 19, 1995: Acquired Willie Banks from the Chicago Cubs for Dax Winslett.
July 31, 1995: Acquired Mark Guthrie and Kevin Tapani from the Minnesota Twins for Greg Hansell, José Parra and Ron Coomer.
August 18, 1995: Acquired Brett Butler from the New York Mets for Scott Hunter and Dwight Maness.

Roster

Game log

Regular season

|-style=background:#cfc
| 3 || April 28 || 7:05p.m. PDT || Braves || 9–1 || Daal (1–0) || Avery (0–1) || – || 3:08 || 51,181 || 3–0 || W3
|-style=background:#fbb
| 4 || April 29 || 7:05p.m. PDT || Braves || 3–4 || McMichael (1–0) || Murphy (0–1) || – || 2:55 || 45,885 || 3–1 || L1
|-style=background:#fbb
| 5 || April 30 || 1:05p.m. PDT || Braves || 3–6 || Smoltz (1–0) || Martínez (1–1) || Clontz (2) || 3:00 || 40,785 || 3–2 || L2
|-

|-

|-style=background:#cfc
| 34 || June 1 || 2:40p.m. PDT || @ Braves || 6–3 || Valdez (1–2) || Mercker (2–2) || – || 2:19 || 27,796 || 15–19 || W2
|-

|-style=background:#fbb
| 64 || July 4 || 4:40p.m. PDT || @ Braves || 2–3 || Clontz (2–1) || Valdez (5–4) || Wohlers (7) || 2:26 || 49,104 || 33–31 || L2
|-style=background:#fbb
| 65 || July 5 || 4:35p.m. PDT || @ Braves || 1–4 || Wohlers (2–2) || Astacio (1–7) || – || 3:01 || 36,922 || 33–32 || L3
|-style=background:#fbb
| 66 || July 6 || 4:40p.m. PDT || @ Braves || 0–1 || McMichael (5–0) || Seánez (1–2) || – || 2:16 || 38,497 || 33–33 || L4
|-style=background:#fbb
| 67 || July 7 || 4:37p.m. PDT || @ Reds || 2–4 || Smiley (9–1) || Banks (0–2) || Jackson (1) || 2:31 || 31,046 || 33–34 || L5
|-style=background:#cfc
| 68 || July 8 || 4:05p.m. PDT || @ Reds || 12–2 || Martínez (8–6) || Nitkowski (1–2) || – || 3:24 || 37,830 || 34–34 || W1
|-style=background:#fbb
| 69 || July 9 || 11:05a.m. PDT || @ Reds || 0–8 || Schourek (8–4) ||Valdez (5–5) || – || 2:29 || 29,589 || 34–35 || L1
|-style=background:#bbbfff
|colspan="12"|66th All-Star Game in Arlington, TX
|-style=background:#cfc
| 83 || July 26 || 7:35p.m. PDT || Braves || 1–0 || Valdez (7–6) || Avery (4–6) || Worrell (17) || 2:19 || 37,491 || 42–41 || W1
|-style=background:#cfc
| 84 || July 27 || 7:05p.m. PDT || Braves || 9–4 || Cummings (1–0) || Mercker (4–6) || – || 2:37 || 36,942 || 43–41 || W2
|-style=background:#fbb
| 85 || July 28 || 7:05p.m. PDT || Reds || 2–3 || Smiley (10–1) || Candiotti (5–9) || Brantley (20) || 2:14 || 37,146 || 43–42 || L1
|-style=background:#cfc
| 86 || July 29 || 7:05p.m. PDT || Reds || 4–2 || Martínez (11–6) || Portugal (5–7) || Worrell (18) || 2:21 || 41,488 || 44–42 || W1
|-style=background:#cfc
| 87 || July 30 || 1:05p.m. PDT || Reds || 5–4 || Nomo (8–2) || Pugh (5–4) || – || 2:31 || 53,058 || 45–42 || W2
|-

|-style=background:#fbb
| 104 || August 17 || 4:36p.m. PDT || @ Reds || 2–6 || Schourek (13–6) || Tapani (7–12) || – || 2:15 || 25,005 || 56–48 || L1
|-

|-

|-

|- style="text-align:center;"
| Legend:       = Win       = Loss       = PostponementBold = Dodgers team member

Postseason Game log

|-style=background:#fbb
| 1 || October 3 || 5:05p.m. PDT || Reds || 2–7 || Schourek (1–0) || Martínez (0–1) || – || 3:15 || 44,199 || 0–1 || L1
|-style=background:#fbb
| 2 || October 4 || 5:05p.m. PDT || Reds || 4–5 || Burba (1–0) || Osuna (0–1) || Brantley (1) || 3:21 || 46,051 || 0–2 || L2
|-style=background:#fbb
| 3 || October 6 || 5:07p.m. PDT || @ Reds || 1–10 || Wells (1–0) || Nomo (0–1) || – || 3:27 || 53,726 || 0–3 || L3
|-

|- style="text-align:center;"
| Legend:       = Win       = Loss     Bold = Dodgers team member

Starting Pitchers statsNote: G = Games pitched; GS = Games started; IP = Innings pitched; W/L = Wins/Losses; ERA = Earned run average; BB = Walks allowed;  SO = Strikeouts; SV = SavesRelief Pitchers statsNote: G = Games pitched; GS = Games started; IP = Innings pitched; W/L = Wins/Losses; ERA = Earned run average; BB = Walks allowed; SO = Strikeouts; S = SavesBatting StatsNote: Pos = Position; G = Games played; AB = At bats; Avg. = Batting average; R = Runs scored; H = Hits; HR = Home runs; RBI = Runs batted in; SB = Stolen bases''

 1995 Playoffs 

1995 National League Division Series
The division series was played between Los Angeles Dodgers and Cincinnati Reds.  Cincinnati ended up winning the series 3-0.

Game 1, October 3
Dodger Stadium, Los Angeles 

Game 2, October 4
Dodger Stadium, Los Angeles 

Game 3, October 6
Riverfront Stadium, Cincinnati 

1995 Awards

1995 Major League Baseball All-Star Game
Mike Piazza starter
Hideo Nomo starter
Todd Worrell reserve
Raúl Mondesí reserve
José Offerman reserve
Rookie of the Year Award
Hideo Nomo
 Gold Glove Award
Raúl Mondesí
Baseball Digest Rookie All-Stars
Hideo Nomo
TSN Rookie Pitcher of the Year Award
Hideo Nomo
TSN National League All-Star
Eric Karros
Mike Piazza

Silver Slugger Award
Eric Karros
Mike Piazza
NL Pitcher of the Month
Hideo Nomo (June 1995)
NL Player of the Month
Mike Piazza (August 1995)
NL Player of the Week
Raúl Mondesí (April 25–30)
Mike Piazza (May 1–7)
Hideo Nomo (June 19–25)
Ramón Martínez (July 10–16)
Eric Karros (July 24–30)
Eric Karros (August 7–13)
Mike Piazza (August 21–27)

 Farm system 

Teams in BOLD''' won League Championships

Major League Baseball draft

The Dodgers selected 85 players in this draft. Of those, six of them would eventually play Major League baseball.

The first draft pick was left handed pitcher David Yocum out of Florida State University. After an impressive first season with the Vero Beach Dodgers of the Florida State League, Yocum experienced pain in his left shoulder, several surgeries failed to correct the problem and he was out of baseball after just two seasons and 15 games. He later became a firefighter.

References

External links 
1995 Los Angeles Dodgers uniform
Los Angeles Dodgers official web site
Baseball-Reference season page
Baseball Almanac season page

Los Angeles Dodgers seasons
Los Angeles Dodgers season
National League West champion seasons
1995 in sports in California